Mister Blues may refer to:
Wynonie Harris (1915–1969) (aka Mister Blues), an American blues shouter and rhythm and blues singer
"Mister Blues", a song by Moby Grape from their 1967 album Moby Grape